Roberto Carlos 1992 or Roberto Carlos (Súper Héroe) is a studio album recorded by Brazilian singer-songwriter Roberto Carlos, It was released by Sony Discos in late 1991 (see 1991 in music). The album was produced by Roberto Livi and includes the number-one single in the Billboard Top Latin Songs chart "Si Piensas, Si Quieres", a duet with Spanish singer Rocío Dúrcal. The album was certified double platinum in Brazil.

Track listing

Source:

Chart performance

References

1992 albums
Roberto Carlos (singer) albums
Spanish-language albums